The Irish League in season 1894–95 comprised 4 teams, and Linfield won the championship.

League standings

Results

References
Northern Ireland - List of final tables (RSSSF)

1894-95
1894–95 domestic association football leagues
Lea